The World Strongman Challenge was one of the most enduring annual strongmen competitions, running in various guises for twenty years, with only two years break. In that time it attained the position of one of the most prestigious strongman contest in the world, after the World's Strongest Man and the World Muscle Power Classic. As with its two international counterparts it attracted the top quality strength athletes of its era, which included every winner of the World's Strongest Man competition from 1980 onwards including Jón Páll Sigmarsson, Geoff Capes and Bill Kazmaier from the 1980s right up to the current WSM champion Žydrūnas Savickas.

History
The World Strongman Challenge (WMPC) first took place in 1987. It was a third major strongman competition with the previously established World's Strongest Man and World Muscle Power Classic having made the popularity of strongman competitions a huge success. The WSC in fact helped fill a void left in 1987 by the absence of the World's Strongest Man event and it may have even been introduced for these purpose. The event immediately attracted the very best athletes in the field and the final placings in that inaugural 1987 competition saw both Jón Páll Sigmarsson and Geoff Capes on the podium. In 1988, despite the reintroduction of WSM, the WSC continued and unlike many other strongman events of the era, the WSC managed to continue without a break right up until 1998, at no point dipping in the quality of the athletes competing.

Beauty and the Beast

1998 appeared to be its final year, but in 1999, the Beauty and the Beast competition, established in 1998, took on the title of World Strongman Challenge. In so doing, it immediately attracted the cream of international strength athletics once again. For five more years, the Beauty and the Beast produced world class champions but in a mirroring of the decline of the WMPC, the WSC also began to lose status. At around 2001 a Strongman Super Series had emerged, an attempt to heighten the profile of the sport. The IFSA World Strongman Super Series was being heavily promoted in 2002 and Beauty and the Beast formed part of that. In the end, it became simply the Grand Prix Final held on January 17, 2003, finishing off the 2002 season. The very next day, a second Hawaii Grand Prix, again deemed Beauty and the Beast, was held as the opener for the 2003 IFSA World Strongman Super Series. This turned out to be the last holding of the event. Like the World Muscle Power Classic, once the Beauty and the Beast became entangled with the Super Series, it lost its stand alone gravitas and quickly fell from favour. In the tentative schedule for the 2004/05 Super Series there was to have been a November Hawaii Grand Prix, but that season was foreshortened and this did not take place.

IFSA
In 2006, IFSA resurrected the World Strongman Challenge holding the event in Tulsa, Oklahoma Žydrūnas Savickas won the event, with Derek Poundstone coming in second and Jon Andersen coming in third. This was the final year that the World Strongman Challenge was held.

Results

Results for the IFSA and Original versions from David Horne's World of Grip.

See also
List of strongman competitions

References

External links
 David Horne's World of Grip

Strongmen competitions